Caño (El) Paujil can refer to these waterfalls in Colombia:
 Caño Paujil, Caquetá, 
 Caño El Paujil, Cesar, 
 Caño Paujil, Cesar, 
 Caño Paujil, Meta, lat 3,76, long -73,83, 
 Caño Paujil, Meta, lat 4,01, long -72,36, 
 Caño Paujil, Meta, lat 4,03, long -73,75, 
 Caño Paujil, Vichada,